Sophie Elisabeth of Schleswig-Holstein (20 September 1619 – 29 April 1657) was a daughter of King Christian IV of Denmark and Kirsten Munk. She shared the title Countess of Schleswig-Holstein with her mother and siblings.

As were her siblings, she was raised by her grandmother Ellen Marsvin and then the supervision of the royal governess Karen Sehested. She was betrothed in 1620 and married on 10 October 1634 to Christian von Pentz, wiith whom she had one daughter Armgaard Agnes von Pentz. She was her mother's favourite child, and her visits to her mother during her house arrest made her father prolong Kirsten's house arrest in 1646. Sophie Elisabeth sided with her sister Leonora Christina Ulfeldt in her conflict with the crown and took Leonora's son to her at the Swedish court in 1654. She returned to Denmark in 1656. Sophie Elisabeth is described as brutal and temperamental.

Ancestry

References 
 Dansk biografisk Lexikon / XVI. Bind. Skarpenberg - Sveistrup  (in Danish)

1619 births
1657 deaths
Danish nobility
17th-century Danish people
People from Skanderborg Municipality
Children of Christian IV of Denmark
Burials at St. Canute's Cathedral
Daughters of kings